Mannheim Hauptbahnhof (German for Mannheim central station) is a railway station in Mannheim in the German state of Baden-Württemberg. It is the second largest traffic hub in southwestern Germany after Stuttgart Hauptbahnhof, with 658 trains a day, including 238 long-distance trains. It is also a key station in the Rhine-Neckar S-Bahn. 100,000 passengers embark, disembark or transfer between trains at the station each day. The station was modernised in 2001. It is classified by Deutsche Bahn as a category 2 station.

Layout
The station is located on the southern edge of central Mannheim. In November 2001, the station was comprehensively redeveloped with a modern shopping and service centre.

Travellers reach the platforms via escalators and lifts in the wings of the entrance hall, which lead to a northern and a southern subway under the tracks. The routes to the platforms have been upgraded to make them accessible for the disabled. Lifts, escalators and a direction system for the visually impaired enable all travellers to reach the trains without assistance. The lifts are to be found in the northern subway while the escalators are located in the southern subway.

There is a Deutsche Bahn lounge for first class passengers and frequent travellers.

Since 1897 the station has had a Bahnhofsmission (“station mission”, a charity established at some major German railway stations that is mainly staffed by volunteers) on platform 1, which among other things helps mobility-impaired tourists.

The station forecourt has stops for several tram and bus lines of Rhein-Neckar-Verkehr (the public transport operator of the Rhine-Neckar region), the Rhein-Haardt Bahn (RHB, an interurban running to the west), the Oberrheinische Eisenbahn (OEG, an interurban running to the east and the northeast) and the bus lines of Busverkehr Rhein-Neckar (a subsidiary of Deutsche Bahn, operating over a large region centred on Mannheim). The central bus station adjacent to the southern end of platform 1 is served by long-distance buses and an airport shuttle service, as well as non-scheduled bus services.

The entrance building continues the line of buildings on the bank of the Rhine southeast from Mannheim Palace. Its central axis faces the Kaiserring, the south-eastern inner-city ring road.

History

The original station of the Badische Hauptbahn (Baden mainline) from Heidelberg, opened in 1840, was a terminal station at the current Tattersall tram stop to the north of the current station. Plans for a bridge over the Rhine to Ludwigshafen (now the Konrad Adenauer Bridge), however, soon made it necessary to move the station.

The station building, some of which still survives, was built between 1871 and 1876.  From around 1900, consideration was given to extending or relocating the station.  In 1915 it was decided to expand the existing station.  In 1927, the front of the station was demolished and rebuilt 10 m closer to the street, doubling the area of the station.  During this restructuring there was debate on whether the facade should be restored to its original form. Ultimately, it was rebuilt in a simplified form. Due to the substantial destruction during World War II and the subsequent reconstruction of the facade it was simplified again and rebuilt without decorative elements, but reminiscent of its previous form.

In the summer 1939 timetable the station is shown as having 94 arriving and departing regular long-distance trains per day. Deutsche Reichsbahn ranked it as the 14th most congested node of its network.

Between 1977 and 1982 a new relay interlocking system (class SpDrS60) was installed, replacing the electro-mechanical interlocking at the eastern end of the station and three push button interlockings in the rest of the station area. In the mid-1980s, the new signal box controlled 74 km of line with 721 appliances (including 250 sets of points and derails as well as 66 main signals).

On 2 June 1985, the Western Entrance to the Riedbahn (Ried Railway) to Mannheim was opened. This avoided the need for trains running from Frankfurt via Mannheim to Stuttgart and Karlsruhe to reverse in Mannheim Hauptbahnhof.

With a total of 269 arrivals and departures of scheduled long-distance trains each day in Mannheim Hauptbahnhof in the timetable for the summer of 1989, it was the tenth most important node in the Deutsche Bundesbahn network. With 308 such arrivals and departures each day in the timetable for the summer of 1996, it had become the sixth most important node in the Deutsche Bahn network.

In 1995, a parking garage was built under the station forecourt and the station building was comprehensively renovated and redesigned between 1999 and 2001. The platform-side buildings were extended and had their symmetry restored, while the entrance hall received a glass dome. The blend of tradition and modernism is considered successful.

With 332 arrivals and departures in the 2004 timetable, the station had become the fifth most important node in the Deutsche Bahn network.

On 18 July 2007, the new central bus station was officially opened adjacent to the station. The nine parking bays used by long-distance buses operated from the bus station are currently served by more than 30 bus routes, according to the operator, Mannheimer Parkhausbetriebe GmbH.

Train collision in 2014

On 1 August 2014, a freight train passing through Mannheim Hauptbahnhof crashed into the side of long-distance passenger train EuroCity 216 (from Graz to Saarbrücken) when both trains entered the station. Five cars of the EuroCity derailed, two of which overturned; two freight cars and the freight locomotive also derailed.  Of the 250 passengers on the EuroCity, 34 were injured, plus four seriously (as stated in the EUB report; numbers vary among sources).  Investigators determined that the freight train had failed to heed a main signal which commanded 'halt' (a red light).  This happened because the driver assumed to not have reached the station yet, so he expected the signals to be on the left side, like the previous ones; but in stations, signals are placed to the right.  Therefore, he took the "proceed" signal for the EuroCity as meant for him. When he passed the main signal at danger, the PZB safety system was triggered and forced the freight train to stop immediately.  Instead of contacting the train controller for instructions, which is mandatory, the driver restarted the train on his own. He assumed that the PZB action was due to the missing acknowledgement of the distant signal ('expect halt') at the same location, but even then permission to continue must be asked for. He then passed two more signals ("Schutzsignale") at danger (red 'halt' aspect, not guarded by PZB) and hit the EuroCity. The accident caused a damage of 2.3 million Euros. In September 2016, the driver was convicted for intentionally endangering railway operations and for bodily injury caused by negligence, because he had continued after the forced braking without permission from the traffic controller. He received six months in prison on probation and 100 hours of community service.

Planned developments

The station lies is at the junction of lines from Stuttgart, Basel, Saarbrücken and Frankfurt.  The Mannheim-Stuttgart high-speed rail line was completed in 1991 and it is planned to build a high-speed line to Frankfurt. Deutsche Bahn had sought to establish a by-pass of the city through the Rheinauer Wald (forest) to the east of the city, including a complex junction in the Pfingstberg Tunnel. This would have substantially reduced the number of long-distance trains serving Mannheim, leading to massive resistance from the city and the region.  As a result, Deutsche Bahn dropped this plan for the time being in 2006.

Extensive changes at the railway tracks of the main station are planned over a three-year construction period. Construction was supposed to have started in late 2007, but had not begun by early 2010. Among other things, a new platform is to be built for the Rhine-Neckar S-Bahn for approximately €50 million.  In addition, regional and long-distance traffic are to be largely segregated, with regional trains being operated in the future on the four tracks closest to the station building and long-distance traffic operating on the more distant tracks.

As part of an urban development project called Mannheim 21 on land on the south side of the station, there are plans to convert the most southerly underpass under the platforms, now used as a baggage tunnel, into a third platform access route and extend it to the Lindenhof; it would not connect to the station building, but would instead connect to the bus station. The current southern underpass, which runs under the middle of the platforms, is frequently overloaded by pedestrian traffic.

Due to the increasing number of passengers using the station forecourt at the interchanges to public transport (currently around 52,000 daily) an upgrade of the Hauptbahnhof tram/light rail stop is proposed. Two versions are discussed: option 1, which includes four new platforms laid across the axis of the whole Kaiserring, is preferred by the city council. Option 2 would add one track and one platform to the existing stop. Rhein-Neckar-Verkehr (Rhine-Neckar Transport) favours option 2 because it would be more practicable, being less expensive and faster to build.

Operational usage

Each day DB operates 238 long-distance trains, 265 regional trains and 155 S-Bahn trains through the station (as of 2009).

Long distance trains
Due to its convenient position, many long-distance lines connect in Mannheim, with overlapping routes creating services at 60-minute intervals on several routes. Various high-speed routes bring major cities in Germany and in neighboring countries within a few hours away and thus provide an alternative to air travel.

Regional services

Rhine-Neckar S-Bahn 
The Rhine-Neckar S-Bahn is the backbone of transport in the Rhine-Neckar region. In December 2003, a 290 km S-Bahn network was put into operation. Further expansion of the S-Bahn network has been agreed on in 2008, but after several delays, the new lines are expected to start in 2020.

Interurban trams 
In the station forecourt is the stop of the metre gauge trams of the Rhein-Neckar-Verkehr (RNV),  served by line 4 of the Rhein-Haardtbahn (RHB) and line 5 of the Oberrheinische Eisenbahn (OEG) two interurban tramways, running over the tracks of Manheim's tram company (the MVV Verkehr AG) within the city limits.

Gallery

References

External links 

 
 

Hauptbahnhof
Rhine-Neckar S-Bahn stations
Railway stations in Germany opened in 1840
Buildings and structures in Mannheim
Mannheim